Láng Station is a metro station in Hanoi, located in Đống Đa, Hanoi.

Station layout

Line 2A

References

External links
Láng Station

Hanoi Metro stations